Oenothera albicaulis is a New World plant in the evening primrose family. It is known by the common names prairie evening-primrose, white-stem evening-primrose, whitish evening primrose, or whitest evening primrose.

Distribution
Oenothera albicaulis is native to North America, in the United States (Arizona; Colorado; Montana; New Mexico; Oklahoma; South Dakota; Texas; and Utah), and in Mexico (in Chihuahua state).

Uses
The Zuni people rub the chewed blossoms on the bodies of young girls so that they can dance well and ensure rain.

References

External links
Picture of an Oenothera albicaulis flower, from Vascular Plants of the Gila Wilderness in association with Western New Mexico University Department of Natural Sciences

albicaulis
Flora of Mexico
Flora of Arizona
Flora of Colorado
Flora of Montana
Flora of New Mexico
Flora of Oklahoma
Flora of South Dakota
Flora of Texas
Flora of Utah
Plants described in 1813
Flora without expected TNC conservation status